The Commercial Hotel is a hotel at 80 High Street in Fremantle, Western Australia. The current building is of three storeys in the Federation Free Classic style, and was registered on the Register of the National Estate in 1978.  It is now the Sundancers Backpackers Hostel.

History 
In 1840 Captain John Thomas built the Southern Cross Hotel, and his wife managed it while he was away at sea. It was later renamed the Albert Hotel and then later the Commercial Hotel.

In 1891 the publican of the Commercial Hotel was E. Jonas.

The hotel was re-built in 1908, and possibly renovated the same year. At this time, a number of other old buildings in nearby lots were being demolished — a newspaper of 1907 reports that:

Current usage 
In about 2000 the hotel was converted into the Sun Dancer Resort backpackers' hostel.

References

External links
Sundancer Backpackers Hostel, official site

Hotels in Fremantle
High Street, Fremantle
1908 establishments in Australia
Heritage places in Fremantle
State Register of Heritage Places in the City of Fremantle